The Minolta AF Macro 100 mm 2.8 lens is a discontinued macro lens produced by Minolta that was renowned for its sharpness all the while garnering raving reviews also. This lens achieves a true 1:1 magnification of the subject matter of interest to the photographer. While still having an aperture of 2.8 coupled with its focal length of 100 mm, it is considered a double duty lens for macro photography and portraiture/portrait photography. It works in conjunction with Minolta's own flash metering system called Advanced Distance Integration (ADI). This macro lens is known as a D lens that works in combination with the D series flash units and select Maxxum camera bodies for the ADI system. ADI flash distance metering and execution of the ADI flash units allows for a more balanced lighting of the subject matter, thereby allowing the Minolta AF 100 mm to perform admirably well in a situation needing a flash. This popular lens offers advanced features and is still offered by its new creator/manufacturer, Sony, to this day. Sony's 2006 production and current version of this lens is based on the Minolta AF Macro 100 mm lens, all the while being identical with the exception of their respective company's markings.

See also
 List of Minolta A-mount lenses
 List of Sony A-mount lenses

References

Notes
 Dyxum lens data
 Minolta AF 100 mm f/2.8 Macro

Camera lenses introduced in 1986
100
Minolta 100 mm f/2.8
Camera lenses introduced in 2006